Middlefield Township is one of sixteen townships in Buchanan County, Iowa, United States.  As of the 2000 census, its population was 304. Middlefield Township was established in 1858.

Geography 

References

External links 

 City-Data.com

Townships in Buchanan County, Iowa
Townships in Iowa
1858 establishments in Iowa
Populated places established in 1858